Denis Velić (born 7 October 1982) is a Swedish football manager and a former player.

Career

Coaching career and post-retirement
In January 2014, Velić began working as a project manager for integration projects within Växjö Municipality. In August 2015, he was hired by OnePartnerGroup as a salesman and later customer manager.

Retiring at the end of 2016, Velić was hired as assistant coach of Thomas Askebrand at his last club Östers IF and also head coach of the club's U21 team. Beside his duties at Östers, he also played a season with Swedish amateur club, Åryds IK, in 2017 together with his former teammate Patrik Bojent.

On 29 July 2019, he was appointed interim head coach of Östers after Christian Järdler was fired. Velić avoided relegation from Superettan and was rewarded with a permanent two-year contract with an option for one further year on 22 November 2019. He left Öster at the end of the 2021 season.

References

External links
 

1982 births
Östers IF players
Syrianska FC players
Allsvenskan players
Superettan players
Swedish people of Bosnia and Herzegovina descent
Swedish footballers
Living people
Association football midfielders
Swedish football managers
Östers IF managers
Östers IF non-playing staff